LFF may stand for:

Association football bodies
Federation Libanaise de Football
Latvian Football Federation
Libyan Football Federation
Lithuanian Football Federation

Politics and government
 Left Foot Forward, a left-wing British blog
 Liberals for Forests, defunct Australian political party
 Liberian Frontier Force (now Armed Forces of Liberia)

Other uses
BFI London Film Festival
Li's force field, urban myth about Hong Kong's imperviousness to cyclones
 Lincoln Financial Field, a stadium in Philadelphia, Pennsylvania, United States
Luke fon Fabre, protagonist of the Tales of the Abyss action role-playing game